Norman or Norm Smith may refer to:

Arts 
Norman Smith (journalist) (born 1959), British BBC journalist
Norman Smith (record producer) (1923–2008), English musician, record producer and engineer
Norman Kemp Smith (1872–1958), Scottish philosopher

Government 
N. Randy Smith (born 1949), federal judge on the United States Court of Appeals for the Ninth Circuit
Norman Smith (politician) (1890–1962), British Labour Party politician
Norm Smith (American politician) (born 1947), member of the Oregon House of Representatives
Norm Smith (Australian politician) (1901–1983), member of the Queensland Legislative Assembly
Norman Lockhart Smith (1887–1968), British colonial administrator
Norman H. Smith (born 1933), United States Marine Corps general

Sports 
Norm Smith (1915–1973), Australian rules football player and coach
Norm Smith (footballer, born 1946), Australian rules footballer
Norm Smith (rugby union), rugby union player who represented Australia
Norman Smith (footballer, born September 1897) (1897–1978), footballer for Charlton Athletic and Queens Park Rangers
Norman Smith (footballer, born December 1897) (1897–1978), footballer for Huddersfield Town, Sheffield Wednesday and Queens Park Rangers, and later manager of Newcastle United
Norman Smith (South African footballer) (born 1982), South African footballer for Jomo Cosmos
Norman Leslie Smith (1890–1958), Australian motor racing driver

See also
List of people with surname Smith